Cassamá is a surname. Notable people with the surname include:

Adilson Soares Cassamá (born 1983), Guinea-Bissauan football (soccer) midfielder
Cipriano Cassamá, politician in Guinea-Bissau and a member of the African Party for the Independence of Guinea and Cape Verde
Ivanildo Cassamá (born 1986), Guinea-Bissauan-born Portuguese footballer who plays for Portimonense SC, as a winger
Moreto Cassamá (born 1998), Guinea-Bissauan footballer who plays for Stade de Reims as a midfielder